Santo & Johnny were an American rock and roll instrumental duo of Italian descent from Brooklyn, New York, composed of brothers Santo Farina (born October 24, 1937) and Johnny Farina (born April 30, 1941).

They are known best for their instrumental melody "Sleep Walk", one of the biggest hits of the golden age of rock 'n' roll, which became a regional success and eventually scored the top of the Billboard pop chart when it was released nationally during 1959.

At present, Santo is semi-retired and Johnny currently tours and records new material with his own band. Johnny is also the president of Aniraf, Inc., an international record company based in New York City.

Career

Early life 
Santo Anthony Farina and John Steven Farina were born in Brooklyn, New York, to Anthony and Josephine Farina: Santo on October 24, 1937, and Johnny on April 30, 1941.
Their father was drafted into the Army while they were children and was stationed for some time in Oklahoma. After hearing a steel guitar by radio, he wrote to his wife, "I'd like the boys to learn to play this instrument".

Upon returning from World War II, the boys' father found a music teacher who gave the boys steel guitar lessons. When Santo was a teenager, he was able to get a local music store to modify an acoustic guitar, allowing him to play it like a steel guitar.

Within two years, Santo was performing in amateur shows using a new Gibson six-string steel guitar and had started receiving lessons from a steel guitar teacher who had studied in Hawaii. By the age of fourteen, Santo was composing songs, and formed an instrumental trio with a guitarist and drummer. This trio appeared at local dances and parties, performing both original compositions and some Hawaiian standards. With money Santo made from these performances, he bought a Fender steel guitar, one with three necks, each with eight strings. This allowed him to experiment even more, and he tried different tunings until he found ones that appealed to him.

When Johnny reached the age of twelve, he began to play accompaniment to Santo on a standard electric guitar. The brothers soon formed a duo and became rather popular in school, eventually performing at events in the New York boroughs. They recorded a demonstration record that they circulated to local New York record companies.

When Johnny turned 16, he told their father that they would be quitting school to pursue a career as "rock stars", to which their father responded "The only stars are in the sky."

The brothers wrote a song one night when they "couldn't sleep after playing a gig, and started jamming." The song was "Sleep Walk" and during September 1959 it scored at the top of the American charts.

Music career 
The brothers eventually came to the attention of a music publishing company and signed a songwriter's contract and eventually landed a recording contract with Canadian-American Records. Their first release, "Sleep Walk", was credited as being composed by the two brothers plus Santo's wife, Ann, although Johnny later said that her name was put on by mistake.
"Sleep Walk" was recorded at Trinity Records in Manhattan. It reached Billboard magazine's No. 1 position for two weeks during September 1959, and earned a Gold record for Santo & Johnny. The follow-up single "Tear Drop" (spelled "Teardrop" on the album Encore) was also successful, though their long-playing (LP) record Santo & Johnny was less successful in the United States.

Legacy 
"Sleep Walk" continues to be popular owing to consistent radio airplay as well as its usage for commercials, television programs, and movies. Santo & Johnny were inducted into the Steel Guitar Hall of Fame in 2002.

Discography

Albums 
Canadian-American Records Ltd
Santo & Johnny (1959)
Encore (1960)
Hawaii (1961)
Come On In (1962)
Around the World... with Santo & Johnny (1962)
Off Shore (1963)
In the Still of the Night (1964)
Santo & Johnny Wish You Love (1964)
The Beatles Greatest Hits Played by Santo & Johnny (1964)
Mucho (1965)
Santo y Johnny en México (1965?)

Imperial
The Brilliant Guitar Sounds of Santo & Johnny (1967)
Golden Guitars (1968)
On the Road Again (1968)
The Best That Could Happen (1969)

Black Tulip
The Original Recordings

Aniraf Record Co.
Christmas Mine – Johnny Farina (2012)
Pure Steel (2007)
Christmas Mine (2008)
Italian Being Served (2009)
Christmas Mine – Johnny Farina (reissued 2012)

PAUSA (aka: Pause) Records
 ''Santo & Johnny (1976)

Singles

References

External links 

Johnny Farina Official Website, Official Album Discography. Retrieved on 2008-04-04.
David Edwards and Mike Callahan, Canadian-American Album Discography. Retrieved on 2007-09-01.
Santo and Johnny at the Space Age Pop Music Page. Retrieved on 2007-09-01.
 
 

American instrumental musical groups
Rock and roll music groups
Rock music groups from New York (state)
Surf music groups
Rock music duos
American musical duos
Sibling musical duos
Family musical groups
Musical groups established in 1959
Musical groups from Brooklyn
American people of Italian descent
Canadian-American Records artists
1959 establishments in New York City